In military terms, 100th Division or 100th Infantry Division may refer to:

 Infantry divisions 

 100th Light Infantry Division (Germany)
 100th Jäger Division (Wehrmacht)
 100th Division (Imperial Japanese Army)
 100th Guards Rifle Division (Soviet Union)
 100th Division (United States)